Ansar ul Islam ("Partisans of Islam") may refer to:

 Ansar al-Islam, a Kurdish Sunni Muslim group in Northern Iraq
 Ansar ul-Islam, a Barelvi Sunni Muslim group in the Khyber Agency, Federally Administered Tribal Areas, Pakistan